The Jefferson Union High School District (JUHSD) is a high school district in northern San Mateo County, California which serves the cities of Daly City, Brisbane and Pacifica, the town of Colma, the CDP of Broadmoor and a section of San Bruno. Its district office is located at the former site of Serramonte High School. It serves as a secondary education district for students coming from the Jefferson Elementary School District, Bayshore School District, Brisbane School District and the Pacifica School District.

History
The Jefferson Union High School District was formed by voters in a March 1922 election, and the first Jefferson High School opened on August 21, 1922, at an old school house on Alemany at the corner of Hill and Market. Voters approved a bond of $180,000 in November 1922 for a new high school building, which was dedicated on May 23, 1925. That building was later demolished in the early 1960s after the opening of the current Jefferson High School building in 1963.

Schools
It consists of four comprehensive high schools, and one continuation school:

Notes

Former Schools
The now closed Serramonte High School was open from 1970 to 1981, returning in a limited form for the two academic years of 1993–1995. At the time, it was proposed to relocate Oceana to the Serramonte campus to save money to restore a state-mandated $750,000 reserve fund for the district. The former campus, now renamed Serramonte Del Rey, serves as the district office.

Teacher housing
In 2018 district voters passed a bond that allowed the district to build housing for teaching staff. Circa 2020 construction began. The facility has 122 apartments.

Enrollment 
According to the California Department of Education, the total enrollment for Jefferson Union High School District is 4,862 in the 2016–17 academic year.

References

Further reading

External links
 Jefferson Union District Website
 

 
School districts in San Mateo County, California
1922 establishments in California
School districts established in 1922